Clipper is a British Fairtrade tea company based in Beaminster, Dorset founded in 1984. In 1994, it was one of the first companies in the UK to receive the Fairtrade Mark. Clipper was purchased in 2012 by Royal Wessanen for around £50 million.

History
Clipper Tea was started in 1984 by Lorraine and Mike Brehme. Already being in the tea industry, they cited increased amounts of child labour in the trade as their original motive to found Clipper. 

Clipper Tea started in the couple's Dorset kitchen with two chests of Assam tea, which they bought for £50 and sold to local health food shops in the Dorset area. Their product approach was "always a pure, natural product – there isn't a single artificial ingredient in any of our products". 

The couple divorced, and in 2007 they sold to Fleming Family & Partners, a fund backed by one of Britain's wealthiest families, for around £25- £30 million.

In 2008, Perry Haydn Taylor's creative branding agency was approached to rebrand the business. They created new Clipper packaging and slogan: "Natural, fair & delicious".

In 2012, the business was sold to Royal Wessanen. Creative branding agencies continue to work with the brand.

Clipper is the UK's sixth biggest tea-brand and their export sales represent 20% of the group turnover with products currently sold in 45 countries. In the first six months of 2013 exports grew by 36% while the 2012 full year increase was 40% above 2011. Export growth is vitally important to the business and has allowed Clipper Teas to invest over £1 million in capital expenditure upgrading its manufacturing facility in Beaminster.

Clipper produces 95 varieties of tea with up to two million tea bags made per day.

In Germany, Spain, and Italy the brand is called "Cupper tea", because another tea-brand had already registered the brand name "Clipper" in Germany.

Ethics
Clipper was founded as an ethical alternative to other teas, and advocates Fairtrade and organic tea. 

Clipper became involved with the Fairtrade Foundation in its earliest stages and policy development. 

All of Clipper's tea is purchased from estates where there is no exploitation of workers. 

In 1994, Clipper was one of the first three companies in the UK to receive the Fairtrade mark and then decided to produce a magazine, called "The Teapot Times", about the history of tea production and the positive impact buying Fairtrade goods had on communities around the world. Clipper also became official advisors to the Fairtrade Foundation for tea.

References

Tea companies of the United Kingdom
Drink brands
Tea brands in the United Kingdom
Fair trade organizations
Fair trade brands